In the mathematical theory of wavelets, a spline wavelet is a wavelet constructed using a spline function. There are different types of spline wavelets. The interpolatory spline wavelets introduced by C.K. Chui and J.Z. Wang are based on a certain spline interpolation formula. Though these wavelets are orthogonal, they do not have compact supports. There is a certain class of wavelets, unique in some sense, constructed using B-splines and having compact supports.  Even though these wavelets are not orthogonal they have some special properties that  have made them quite popular.  The terminology spline wavelet is sometimes used to refer to the wavelets in this  class of  spline wavelets. These special wavelets are  also called B-spline wavelets and cardinal B-spline wavelets. The Battle-Lemarie wavelets are also wavelets constructed using spline functions.

Cardinal B-splines

Let n be a fixed non-negative integer. Let Cn denote the set of all real-valued functions defined over the set of  real numbers such that each  function in the set as well its first n derivatives are continuous everywhere. A bi-infinite sequence . . . x−2, x−1, x0, x1, x2, . . .  such that xr < xr+1 for all r and such that xr approaches ±∞ as r approaches ±∞ is said to define a set of knots. A spline of order n  with a set of knots {xr} is a function S(x) in Cn such that, for each r,  the restriction of S(x) to the interval [xr, xr+1) coincides with a polynomial with real coefficients of degree at most n in x.

If the separation xr+1 - xr, where r is any integer,   between the successive knots in the set of knots is a constant, the spline is called a cardinal spline. The set of integers Z = {. . ., -2, -1, 0, 1, 2, . . .} is a standard choice for the set of knots of a cardinal spline. Unless otherwise specified, it is generally assumed that the set of knots is the set of integers.

A cardinal B-spline is a special type of cardinal spline. For any positive integer m the cardinal B-spline of order m, denoted by Nm(x), is defined recursively as follows.

Concrete expressions for the cardinal B-splines of all orders up to 5 and their graphs are given later in this article.

Properties of the cardinal B-splines

Elementary properties
  for all .
 The cardinal B-splines of orders m and m-1 are related by the identity: .

Two-scale relation
The cardinal B-spline of order m satisfies the following two-scale relation:
.

Riesz property

The cardinal B-spline of order m satisfies the following property, known as the Riesz property: There exists two positive real numbers  and  such that for any square summable two-sided sequence  and for any x,

where  is the norm in the ℓ2-space.

Cardinal B-splines of small orders
The cardinal B-splines are defined recursively starting from the B-spline of order 1, namely ,  which takes the value 1 in the interval [0, 1) and 0 elsewhere. Computer algebra systems may have to be employed to obtain concrete expressions for higher order cardinal B-splines. The concrete expressions for cardinal B-splines of all orders up to 6 are given below. The graphs of cardinal B-splines of orders up to 4 are also exhibited. In the images, the graphs of the terms contributing to the corresponding two-scale relations are also shown.  The two dots in each image indicate the extremities of the interval supporting the B-spline.

Constant B-spline

The B-spline of order 1, namely , is the constant B-spline. It is defined by

The two-scale relation for this B-spline is

Linear B-spline
The B-spline of order 2, namely , is the linear B-spline. It is given by

The two-scale relation for this wavelet is

Quadratic B-spline
The B-spline of order 3, namely , is the quadratic B-spline. It is given by

The two-scale relation for this wavelet is

Cubic B-spline
It is given by the following expressions:

The two-scale relation for the cubic B-spline is

Bi-quadratic B-spline
It is given by

The two-scale relation is

Quintic B-spline
It is given by

Multi-resolution analysis generated by cardinal B-splines

The cardinal B-spline  of order m generates a multi-resolution analysis. In fact, from the elementary properties of these functions enunciated above, it follows that the function  is square integrable and is an element of the space  of square integrable functions. To set up the multi-resolution analysis the following notations used.
 
 For any integers , define the function .

That these define a multi-resolution analysis follows from the following:

 The spaces  satisfy the property: .
 The intersection of all the subspaces  is the singleton set containing only the zero function.
(A sequence {xn} in a Banach space X is an unconditional basis for the space X if every permutation of the sequence {xn} is also a basis for the same space X.)

Wavelets from cardinal B-splines
Let m be a fixed positive integer and  be the cardinal  B-spline of order m. There is no unique basic wavelet  relative to the cardinal B-spline . Some of these are discussed in the following sections.

Wavelets relative to cardinal B-splines using fundamental interpolatory splines

Fundamental interpolatory spline

Definitions

Let m be a fixed positive integer and let  be the cardinal B-spline of order m. Given a sequence  of real numbers, the problem of finding a sequence  of real numbers such that

 for all ,

is known as the cardinal spline interpolation problem. The special case of this problem where the sequence  is the sequence , where  is the Kronecker delta function   defined by
,
is the fundamental cardinal spline interpolation problem. The solution of the problem yields the fundamental cardinal interpolatory spline of order m.

where the sequence  is now the solution of the following system of equations:

Procedure to find the fundamental cardinal interpolatory spline

The fundamental cardinal interpolatory spline  can be determined using Z-transforms. Using the following notations

it can be seen from the equations defining the sequence  that

from which we get

.

Example

As a concrete example, the case  may be investigated. The definition of  implies that

Thus  reduces to

Splitting this expression into partial fractions and expanding each term in powers of z in an annular region the values of  can be computed.

Wavelet using fundamental interpolatory spline
For a positive integer m, the function  defined by

is a basic wavelet relative to the cardinal B-spline of order . This basic wavelet is not compactly supported.

Example

The wavelet of order 2 using interpolatory spline is given by

 
The expression for  now yields the following formula:

Two-scale relation 

The  two-scale relation for the wavelet function  is given by

 where

Compactly supported B-spline wavelets
The spline wavelets generated using the interpolatory wavelets are not compactly supported. Compactly supported B-spline wavelets were discovered by  Charles K. Chui and Jian-zhong Wang and published in 1991. These wavelets are essentially  unique in a certain sense explained below.

Definition
The compactly supported B-spline wavelet of order m is given by

This is an m-th order spline. As a special case, the compactly supported B-spline wavelet of order 1 is

which is the well-known Haar wavelet.

Properties
 The wavelet  is the unique wavelet with minimum support in the following sense: If  generates  and has support not exceeding  in length then  for some nonzero constant  and for some integer .
  is symmetric for even m and antisymmetric for odd m.

Two-scale relation
 satisfies the two-scale relation:

 where .

Decomposition relation

The decomposition relation for the compactly supported B-spline wavelet has the following form:

 

 

Here the sequence  is the sequence of coefficients in the fundamental interpolatoty cardinal spline wavelet of order m.

Compactly supported B-spline wavelets of small orders

Compactly supported B-spline wavelet of order 1 

The two-scale relation for the compactly supported B-spline wavelet of order 1 is

The closed form expression for compactly supported B-spline wavelet of order 1 is

Compactly supported B-spline wavelet of order 2 

The two-scale relation for the compactly supported B-spline wavelet of order 2 is

The closed form expression for compactly supported B-spline wavelet of order 2 is

Compactly supported B-spline wavelet of order 3 

The two-scale relation for the compactly supported B-spline wavelet of order 3 is

The closed form expression for compactly supported B-spline wavelet of order 3 is

Compactly supported B-spline wavelet of order 4 

The two-scale relation for the compactly supported B-spline wavelet of order 4 is

The closed form expression for compactly supported B-spline wavelet of order 4 is

Compactly supported B-spline wavelet of order 5 

The two-scale relation for the compactly supported B-spline wavelet of order 5 is

The closed form expression for compactly supported B-spline wavelet of order 5 is

Images of compactly supported B-spline wavelets

Battle-Lemarie wavelets
The Battle-Lemarie wavelets form a class of orthonormal wavelets constructed using the class of cardinal B-splines. The expressions for these wavelets are given in the frequency domain; that is, they are defined by specifying their Fourier transforms.

Definition
Let m be a positive integer and let  be the cardinal B-spline of order m. The scaling function  for the m-th order Battle-Lemarie wavelet is that function whose Fourier transform is

The m-th order Battle-Lemarie wavelet is the function  whose Fourier transform is

References

Further reading

Wavelets
Continuous wavelets
Splines (mathematics)